Sweetwater High School (commonly referred to as SUHi and SUH within the district) is a secondary school located in National City, California, United States.  Established in 1920, it is one of the oldest high schools in San Diego County. Flagship of the Sweetwater Union High School District, SUHI predominantly serves the National City community with an enrollment of 2,675 students.

In 2009, Sweetwater High School was named on Newsweek's list of the top 1,500 public high schools in the United States. In 2016 it ranked 2065th on U.S. News & World Reports list of best high schools.

History
Built in 1882 near the present site of Central Elementary School at 9th Street and E Avenue, National School was the South Bay's first high school. National's successor, National City High School, was built in 1908 around that same location, where Central Elementary School now stands. To accommodate the growing population of high school students, Sweetwater Union High School was built in 1921 at 2900 Highland Avenue. The present day administration building was originally two-stories with the library upstairs.

The New Gym was added in the early 2000s and is the blue print for many of the gyms of other schools built in the 2000s part of the Sweetwater Union High School District.

Thanks to Proposition O, the Sweetwater Union High School District was able to fund a remodel of SUHI's aging campus. This extensive upgrade, which incorporates some of the classic architecture in the new design, with a new three story building housing the new counseling center, administration, library, theater, teacher offices and 31 classrooms. This portion was completed in the summer of 2011. Originally 80% of the campus was proposed to be redone, with a new quad and the replacement of the bungalows, but due to the “pay-to-play” scandal in the Sweetwater Union High School District only the “new building” was built after the contractors were fired.

Demographics

According to U.S. News & World Report, based on the 2013–2014 school year, 99% of Sweetwater's student body is "minority enrollment", with 87% of the student body coming from an economically disadvantaged household, determined by student eligibility for California's reduced-price meal program.

Approximately 25.5% of SUHI's student population are designated English Language Learners, and 12.8% are students with disabilities.

Academics
The Sweetwater High School staff consists of 201 teachers, administrators, counselors, and support staff. Their 101 teachers offer a variety of AP courses in English Literature, English Language, Spanish, Physics, Biology, Chemistry, Environmental Science, World History, United States History, Art History, Calculus, Statistics, Computer Science, Government, Economics, and Psychology.  SUHI is home to marching and concert band as well to Marine Corps Junior Reserve Officer's Training Corps (MCJROTC). The Red Devil Corps is a class 2A marching band that performs in the SCSBOA circuit. Sweetwater High School has also integrated a career technical education program that consists of educating students in the medical, fire fighting, and other technical fields such as welding.

In order to increase the number of SUHI students who continue on to post-secondary education, the school has formed partnerships with University of California, San Diego, San Diego State University (through Compact for Success), and Southwestern College.

Clubs
SUHI is home to several clubs including Link Crew, Media, MECHA, AIA (Asian International Association), Band Club, BSU (Black Student Union), Choir Club, Do Something Club, Folklorico Club, Football, Girls Who Code, Key Club, MECHA (Movimiento Estudiantil Chicano de Aztlán), Remember Your Roots Club, Rowing Club, Salty Crew (Fishing Club), CASC, Team R.E.D. (Respect Every Devil), Sweetwater Red Cross Club, Mabuhay Club, Academic Decathlon, the Marine Corps Junior ROTC (MCJROTC), Travel Club. Many of these clubs have been around at SUHi for over 3 decades.

SUHI Foundation
Found in 2006 with the help of SUHI alumni, The SUHI Foundation is a 501(c)(3) group that provides scholarships, student financial aid services, and awards students in need.

Awards
 SUHI is a California Distinguished School recipient.

Notable alumni

 Orley Ashenfelter- Class of 1960; professor of economics at Princeton University
 Joe Corona - Class of 2008; Houston Dynamo professional soccer player and United States Men's National Soccer Team
 Roberto de la Madrid - Governor of Baja California from 1977 to 1983
 Rebekah Del Rio - Class of 1985; recording artist on several motion picture soundtracks
 Gail Devers - Class of 1984; sprinter, three-time Olympic 100 m champion in National Track and Field Hall of Fame
 Robert Lopez - Class of 1977; El Vez 
 Gino Minutelli - Class of 1982; former MLB baseball player
 Vidal Nuño - Class of 2005; MLB baseball player
 Dan Saleaumua - Class of 1982; former NFL football player

Notes

External links
 Official School Website
 District Website

High schools in San Diego County, California
National City, California
Public high schools in California
Educational institutions established in 1921
1921 establishments in California